Phandouangchit Vongsa (born 12 December 1942) is a Laotian politician, a member of the Lao People's Revolutionary Party, and  a representative of the National Assembly of Laos for Oudomxay Province (Constituency 4).

References

Members of the National Assembly of Laos
Members of the 6th Central Committee of the Lao People's Revolutionary Party
Members of the 7th Central Committee of the Lao People's Revolutionary Party
Members of the 8th Central Committee of the Lao People's Revolutionary Party
Members of the 9th Central Committee of the Lao People's Revolutionary Party
Lao People's Revolutionary Party politicians
1942 births
Living people